Mian Jam Rural District is a rural district (dehestan) in the Central District of Torbat-e Jam County, Razavi Khorasan Province, Iran. At the 2006 census, its population was 22,862, in 5,076 families.  The rural district has 34 villages.

References 

Rural Districts of Razavi Khorasan Province
Torbat-e Jam County